Oeumsan is a mountain in the counties of Hongcheon and Hoengseong, Gangwon-do in South Korea.

See also
 List of mountains in Korea

Notes

References
    

Mountains of South Korea
Mountains of Gangwon Province, South Korea